Dragon Ball Z: Wrath of the Dragon, known in Japan as  or by Toei's own English title Dragon Ball Z: Explosion of Dragon Punch, is a 1995 Japanese animated science fantasy martial arts film and the thirteenth Dragon Ball Z feature film. It was originally released in Japan on July 15 at the Toei Anime Fair. It was later dubbed into English by Funimation in 2006, just like most of the other Dragon Ball films. It was also released on VCD in Malaysia by Speedy Video with the subtitle Explosion of Dragon Punch.

Set after the events of the final battle with Kid Buu, the film focuses on the efforts of an evil magician, Hoi, to release the deadly monster Hirudegarn onto the Earth, forcing Goku and his friends to enlist the aid of a warrior named Tapion, who may be the only one capable of defeating the monster. Series creator Akira Toriyama designed the Tapion and Minotia characters.

Plot

On an unknown world, a young humanoid is crushed to death by a gigantic monster which then vanishes as an unseen entity laughs and announces that it is headed for Earth.

On Earth, Gohan and Videl, acting as their superhero personas Great Saiyaman and Great Saiyaman 2, stop an elderly man from committing suicide. The man introduces himself as Hoi and presents them with an enchanted music box, claiming that a hero named Tapion is trapped inside and is their only chance to stop an approaching evil. With all other methods of potentially opening the box exhausted, the magical Dragon Balls are assembled and a wish to the eternal dragon Shenron is used to open it. Tapion is released but expresses anger at having been freed, explaining that inside of him is half of the ferocious monster called Hirudegarn that only the box was keeping at bay. 

Tapion flees into isolation but is visited by Trunks who takes a liking to him. The lower half of Hirudegarn soon appears and begins attacking the city. Gohan and Videl attempt to fight it with Gohan learning that Hirudegarn is intangible except when it attacks. The fight ensues until Tapion plays a tune on his ocarina which weakens Hirudegarn and causes it to vanish. Hoi claims that Tapion is the true threat and that the ocarina must be destroyed, so he attempts to steal the instrument and in the ensuing scuffle, Trunks takes possession of it and chooses to side with Tapion. Hoi flees and Tapion accepts Trunks as a friend. Tapion relays his story to Bulma and explains that one-thousand years prior an evil race of alien sorcerers set out to destroy all life in the universe by awakening Hirudegarn. Their conquest eventually brought them to Tapion's planet where during the battle, a priest created an enchanted sword and two ocarinas capable of stopping Hirudegarn. 

Tapion and his younger brother Minotia kept the monster at bay with the ocarinas while the priest cleaved it in half with the sword. In the aftermath, a war council decided to have Hirudegarn's two halves sealed inside of Tapion and Minotia and have them locked inside enchanted music boxes to be sent to opposite ends of the universe. Hoi, one of the surviving sorcerers, found and killed Minotia and now seeks Tapion's in order to complete Hirudegarn's revival. Bulma builds Tapion a specialized bedroom so that he can sleep without the monster escaping. However, this fails. The monster's lower half reappears and in desperation, Tapion begs for death in order to destroy Hirudegarn's upper half, but the beast manages to escape. Its revival complete, Hirudegarn lays waste to the city and is confronted by Goku, Gohan, and Goten who are no match for the monster. 

Vegeta arrives to join the fight but is quickly defeated as well while Trunks and Goten fuse into Gotenks and bombard Hirudegarn with energy blasts. Hirudegarn then transforms into a more powerful form and defeats Gotenks effortlessly. Tapion attempts to seal Hirudegarn inside of himself again by playing the ocarina and asks Trunks to kill him with the sword once he does. Trunks hesitates and Hirudegarn escapes yet again, destroying the ocarina in the process. As Hoi gloats over his apparent victory, he is crushed to death by the monster. Goku learns from Gohan that the monster is only vulnerable after attacking and he takes a beating until Trunks intervenes and cuts the monster's tail off with the sword. An enraged Hirudegarn is weakened allowing Goku uses his Dragon Fist attack to finally kill it.

Tapion uses Bulma's time machine to return to his planet before it was destroyed. Before departing, Tapion presents Trunks with his sword as a farewell gift. In the ending credits, Future Trunks is shown slaying Frieza with a similar sword.

Cast

Music
IN (Insert Song):
 
 Lyrics by Yukinojō Mori
 Music by Tetsuji Hayashi
 Arranged by 
 Performed by 
ED (Ending Theme):
 Ore ga Yaranakya Dare ga Yaru
 Lyrics by Yukinojō Mori
 Music by Tetsuji Hayashi
 Arranged by Yūzō Hayashi
 Performed by Hironobu Kageyama

English dub soundtrack
The score for the Funimation English dub is composed by Nathan Johnson. He learned to play the ocarina for Tapion's theme. The Double Feature release contains an alternate audio track containing the English dub with original Japanese background music by Shunsuke Kikuchi and an ending theme of "Ore ga Yaranakya Dare ga Yaru".

Box office
At the Japanese box office, the film sold  tickets and earned a net distribution rental income of ,.

In the United States, the DVD release has grossed $4,770,466 in sales, .

Releases
In Japan, several editions of the film were released on both Blu-ray and DVD. The first DVD was manufactured by Toei Video and released on April 14, 2006, under the title DRAGON BOX THE MOVIES, a limited edition containing all 17 theatrical films of Dragon Ball, it also contains a deluxe box, a special brochure, a postcard-sized film poster sticker, and two personal transceivers that you can use to talk to your friends or coordinate your attacks. On February 13, 2009, Toei Video released the individual DVD of the film with some special features and bonus tracks. The Blu-ray Dragon Ball The Movies # 07 was released on January 9, 2019 and includes 2 episodes, Dragon Ball Z: Wrath of the Dragon and Dragon Ball: The Path to Power, it comes with an 8 page booklet and HD remastered scanned from negative.

It was released on DVD in North America on September 12, 2006, It was later released in final Double Feature set along with Fusion Reborn (1995) for Blu-ray and DVD on May 19, 2009, both feature full 1080p format in HD remastered 16:9 aspect ratio and an enhanced 5.1 surround mix. The film was re-released to DVD in final remastered thinpak collection on January 3, 2012, containing the last 4 Dragon Ball Z films.

Other companies
A second English dub produced and released exclusively in Malaysia by Speedy Video features an unknown voice cast.

External links

 Official anime website of Toei Animation
 
 Review on IGN
 Review at AnimeOnDVD.com

References

1995 anime films
Wrath of the Dragon
Funimation
Toei Animation films
Films scored by Shunsuke Kikuchi
Superheroes in anime and manga